Hamid Bey (Kapancı) was the vali of Diyarbekir vilayet until his replacement by Mehmed Reshid on 25 March 1915.

References

Governors of Diyarbakır